Christian Manrique Valdor (born 1975 in Santander, Spain) is the Spanish civil engineer and the CEO and founder of Soulware Global Development. From 2007-2011 he was the youngest ever Chairman of Spanish Port Authority, taking this post in Santander.

Port Authority of Santander 
On 24 September 2007 Manrique was appointed Chairman of the Port Authority of Santander  by the Spanish minister of Public Works, Magdalena Álvarez, proposed by the Government of Cantabria. With this appointment, at age 31, he became the youngest ever Chairman of a Spanish Port Authority. The Port Authority is the public institution managing the port of Santander in Cantabria within the bay of Santander.

Activities as Chairman of the Port Authority
Between 2007 and 2011 the Port Authority took different steps to improve its relations with the city, its citizens and its stakeholders. 
 Santander Sea Front: Investment in the sea front has reached 300 million euros  and has allowed the sharing of port facilities and spaces with the citizenry. This investment includes the construction of the Alejandro Zaera High Performance Shipping Centre and the Emilio Botín Arts Centre. The signing of the agreement, on 19 March 2011, was the first step, after a long period of research, to develop new business and recreational areas within the city. Thanks to this project, different historical sections of the harbour were improved.  
 Environmental issues: The deployment of the coal terminal eliminated dust particles that once surrounded the city. Also the seed bulk terminal became a major improvement for food tracking. 
 Added value traffic: New car shipping routes from different brands - Ford, Tata, Iveco, BMW and MINI, among others - were added to the existing ones to grow activity among port agents. Also, a new traffic route was settled with Gothenburg, Sweden.
 Port transit forbidden within the city of Santander: Construction of the Raos Bridge became the solution to drive all heavy freight lorry traffic through port facilities.   
 Motorways of the Sea improvement: Motorway of the Sea to the United Kingdom with Brittany Ferries and to Zeebrugge, in Belgium, was enhanced. By doing so, heavy lorry traffic decreased within the area. This also increased road security and improved environmental conditions. 
 Training: The International Centre for Port Technology and Administration (CITAP) for postgraduate studies in logistics and port facilities settled in Santander. The centre has links with the Spanish Cooperation Agency AECID, OEA, Puertos del Estado and Cantabria University.

References 

Spanish chief executives
Spanish civil engineers
1975 births
Living people